VenueGen is a browser-based web conferencing service created and marketed by The Venue Network. It is a 3D virtual meeting software that enables users to interact with each other using avatars. Users can host and attend meetings, conferences, and trainings with other colleagues and upload rich media into virtual meeting rooms for real-time collaboration.

Technology

Avatars
The avatars in VenueGen are created using a licensed technology developed at the University of Southern California that converts a photo into a 3D model. The realistic photo-generated 3D avatar face features a set of morph targets that convey facial expressions. Facial expressions can be controlled by the user through preset buttons in-world.

Prior to entering a meeting, users can upload images of their own faces to create their photo-realistic avatars and choose from a built-in selection of hairstyles, clothing and accessories to resemble themselves as they are in real life.

During a virtual meeting, avatars make conversational gestures that are automatically driven by a user's own voice. Users also have the option to control the mood, body posture, and nonverbal language of their avatars to communicate as they would in a real meeting. The avatars movements and gestures are intentionally limited to those that would be useful in a meeting.

Venues
VenueGen has over 36 different virtual meeting spaces including a board room, executive office, lecture hall, theater, sailboat, campfire, coffee shop, amphitheater and talk show studio where users can conduct their online meetings, conferences, interviews, or trainings. The largest virtual room can accommodate up to 50 guests. The smallest is suitable for 2 guests.

Audio
Users with a headset and a broadband connection can communicate through VoIP or dial-in from a phone line using one of VenueGen's designated conference phone numbers. Voices of participants are heard in-world through 3D positional sound audio that enables users to locate and identify users speaking around the room.

Integrated Content
Screen sharing and content sharing supports integration of word processing, spreadsheet, presentation and digital media files. Documents used during the meeting are displayed on a viewer within the virtual rooms. The viewer(s) can be viewable by anyone in the meeting, or just one person depending on the venue and viewer chosen. Each viewer may display several forms of content simultaneously, including documents, or streamed feeds such as a webcam or Desktop sharing session.

Virtual Technology
VenueGen is a software as a service (SaaS) that is built on a MMO engine and runs 3D graphics technology. It is a browser-based plug-in that is available as a download once logged on the VenueGen website. The software application runs on Windows XP, Windows Vista, Windows 7, and Mac OS X operating systems and is compatible with browsers Mozilla Firefox 2.0 or above and Microsoft Internet Explorer 6.0 or above.

History
In 2007, VenueGen was founded by business entrepreneur David Gardner. The virtual meeting software was developed by The Venue Network in Research Triangle Park, North Carolina and became commercially available in early 2010. The VenueGen business application has been compared to Second Life's virtual meeting spaces. Its main web conferencing competitors are WebEx, Fuze Meeting, and Dimdim.

References

External links
 
 VenueGen blog
 VenueGen on YouTube

Telecommuting
Teleconferencing
Videotelephony
Web conferencing